Gunnarnes Chapel is a chapel of the Church of Norway in Måsøy Municipality in Troms og Finnmark county, Norway. It is located in the village of Gunnarnes on the island of Rolvsøya. It is an annex chapel for the Måsøy parish which is part of the Hammerfest prosti (deanery) in the Diocese of Nord-Hålogaland. The white, wooden church was built in 1986. The church seats about 77 people.

See also
List of churches in Nord-Hålogaland

References

Måsøy
Churches in Finnmark
Wooden churches in Norway
20th-century Church of Norway church buildings
Churches completed in 1986
1986 establishments in Norway